China–Honduras relations refers to the bilateral international relations between the Republic of Honduras and the People's Republic of China. Neither country has a resident ambassador.

History 
On March 14, 2023, Honduran President Xiaomara Castro announced that she had directed her foreign minister to begin the process of opening official relations with China. During her presidential campaign in the 2021 Honduran general election, Castro had referenced the possibility of Honduras cutting its relations with Taiwan and beginning relations with the People's Republic of China, although as recently as January 2022 she had stated a desire for Honduras to maintain ties with Taiwan. The Chinese foreign ministry stated that it welcomed President Castro's announcement, noting China's position that "[o]n the basis of the One-China principle, China is willing to develop friendly and cooperative relations with Honduras and other countries in the world."

Economic relations
According to the Central Bank of Honduras, Honduras's exports to China totaled $24.7 million in 2020.

In March 2023, Honduras announced that it was negotiating with China to build a hydroelectric dam, Patuca II.

See also
Foreign relations of China
Foreign relations of Honduras

References 

China–Honduras relations
Bilateral relations of Honduras
Bilateral relations of China